Hilara is a genus of dance flies, in the fly family Empididae.

Species
H. aartseni Chvála, 1997
H. abdominalis Zetterstedt, 1838
H. aeronetha Mik, 1892
H. albanica Engel, 1943
H. albipennis von Roser, 1840
H. albitarsis von Roser, 1840
H. albiventris von Roser, 1840
H. algecirasensis Strobl, 1899
H. allogastra Chvála, 2001
H. almeriensis Strobl, 1906
H. alpicola Chvála, 2001
H. andermattensis Strobl, 1892
H. anglodanica Lundbeck, 1913
H. angustifrons Strobl, 1892
H. apta Collin, 1927
H. arkhyziensis Kustov, Shamshev and Grootaert, 2013
H. arnaudi Niesiolowski, 1991
H. barbipes Frey, 1908
H. beckeri Strobl, 1892
H. biseta Collin, 1927
H. bistriata Zetterstedt, 1842
H. bohemica Straka, 1976
H. borealis Oldenberg, 1916
H. brevipilosa Collin, 1966
H. brevistyla Collin, 1927
H. brevivittata Macquart, 1827
H. caerulescens Oldenberg, 1916
H. calinota Collin, 1969
H. campinosensis Niesiolowski, 1986
H. canescens Zetterstedt, 1849
H. cantabrica Strobl, 1899
H. caucasica Kustov, Shamshev and Grootaert, 2013
H. chorica (Fallén, 1816)
H. cilipes Meigen, 1822
H. cineracea Niesiolowski, 1986
H. cinereomicans Strobl, 1892
H. clavipes (Harris, 1776)
H. clypeata Meigen, 1822
H. coracina Oldenberg, 1916
H. cornicula Loew, 1873
H. cuneata Loew, 1873
H. curtisi Collin, 1927
H. curvipes Siebke, 1864
H. czernyi Strobl, 1909
H. dalmatina Strobl, 1898
H. deltaica Parvu, 1994
H. deryae Ciftci & Hasenbli, 2011
H. dimidiata Strobl, 1892
H. discalis Chvála, 1997
H. discoidalis Lundbeck, 1910
H. discolor Strobl, 1892
H. diversipes Strobl, 1892
H. empidoides Frey, 1958
H. escorialensis Strobl, 1909
H. eviana Straka, 1976
H. femorella Zetterstedt, 1842
H. flavidipes Chvála, 1997
H. flavipes Meigen, 1822
H. flavitarsis Straka, 1976
H. flavocoxa Straka, 1976
H. flavohalterata Strobl, 1898
H. fulvibarba Strobl, 1899
H. fuscipes (Fabricius, 1794)
H. fusitibia Strobl, 1899
H. galactoptera Strobl, 1910
H. gallica (Meigen, 1804)
H. gooti Chvála, 1999
H. griseifrons Collin, 1927
H. griseola Zetterstedt, 1838
H. hasankoci Ciftci & Hasenbli, 2011
H. helvetica Chvála, 1999
H. hirta Strobl, 1892
H. hirtella Collin, 1927
H. hirtipes Collin, 1927
H. hudsoni Hutton, 1901
H. hybrida Collin, 1961
H. hyposeta Straka, 1967
H. hystrix Strobl, 1892
H. implicata Collin, 1927
H. infuscata Brullé, 1832
H. intermedia (Fallén, 1816)
H. interstincta (Fallén, 1816)
H. joannae Niesiolowski, 1991
H. lacteipennis Strobl, 1892
H. lapponica Chvála, 2002
H. lasiochira Strobl, 1892
H. lasiopa Strobl, 1892
H. laurae Becker, 1908
H. lindbergi Vaillant, 1963
H. litorea (Fallén, 1816)
H. longeciliata Strobl, 1906
H. longesetosa Strobl, 1910
H. longicornis Strobl, 1894
H. longivittata Zetterstedt, 1842
H. lugubris (Zetterstedt, 1819)
H. lundbecki Frey, 1913
H. lurida (Fallén, 1816)
H. macedonica Engel, 1941
H. macquarti Straka, 1984
H. magica Mik, 1887
H. maior Strobl, 1910
H. manicata Meigen, 1822
H. marginipennis Strobl, 1909
H. martini Chvála, 1981
H. matroniformis Strobl, 1892
H. maura (Fabricius, 1776)
H. medeteriformis Collin, 1961
H. media Collin, 1927
H. merula Collin, 1927
H. merzi Chvála, 1999
H. miriptera Straka, 1976
H. monedula Collin, 1927
H. morata Collin, 1927
H. morenae Strobl, 1899
H. mroga Niesiolowski, 1986
H. nadolna Niesiolowski, 1986
H. nigrina (Fallén, 1816)
H. nigritarsis Zetterstedt, 1838
H. nigrocincta Meijere, 1935
H. nigrohirta Collin, 1927
H. nitidorella Chvála, 1997
H. nitidula Zetterstedt, 1838
H. novakii Mik, 1892
H. obscura Meigen, 1822
H. palmarum Strobl, 1906
H. pectinipes Strobl, 1892
H. perversa Oldenberg, 1916
H. pilipes Zetterstedt, 1838
H. pilosa Zetterstedt, 1842
H. pilosopectinata Strobl, 1892
H. platyura Loew, 1873
H. ponti Chvála, 1982
H. primula Collin, 1927
H. pruinosa Wiedemann in Meigen, 1822
H. psammophytophilia Beschovski, 1973
H. pseguashae Kustov, Shamshev and Grootaert, 2013
H. pseudochorica Strobl, 1892
H. pseudocornicula Strobl, 1909
H. pseudosartrix Strobl, 1892
H. pulchripes Frey, 1913
H. quadriclavata Strobl, 1899
H. quadrifaria Strobl, 1892
H. quadrifasciata Chvála, 2002
H. quadriseta Collin, 1927
H. quadrula Chvála, 2002
H. recedens Walker, 1851
H. regneali Parvu, 1991
H. rejecta Collin, 1927
H. sartor Becker, 1888
H. scrobiculata Loew, 1873
H. setosa Collin, 1927
H. simplicipes Strobl, 1892
H. splendida Straka, 1976
H. strakai Chvála, 1981
H. strakaiana Parvu, 1993
H. sturmii Wiedemann in Meigen, 1822
H. styriaca Strobl, 1893
H. submaura Collin, 1927
H. subpollinosa Collin, 1927
H. sulcitarsis Strobl, 1892
H. tanychira Strobl, 1892
H. tanythrix Frey, 1913
H. tarsata Siebke, 1864
H. tatra Niesiolowski, 1991
H. tenella (Fallén, 1816)
H. tenuinervis Zetterstedt, 1838
H. ternovensis Strobl, 1898
H. tetragramma Loew, 1873
H. thoracica Macquart, 1827
H. tiefii Strobl, 1892
H. treheni Niesiolowski, 1991
H. trigemina Strobl, 1909
H. tyrolensis Strobl, 1892
H. veletica Chvála, 1981
H. veltmani Chvála, 1999
H. veneta Collin, 1966
H. vistula Niesiolowski, 1991
H. vltavensis Straka, 1976
H. woodiella Chvála, 1999
H. zermattensis Chvála, 1999

References

Empididae
Empidoidea genera